This is a list of homicides committed by firearms in the state of Florida which have a Wikipedia article for the killing, the killer, or a related subject.

See also
 List of shootings in California
 List of shootings in Colorado
 List of shootings in New York (state)
 List of shootings in Texas

Florida-related lists
Crime in Florida
 
Lists of shootings by location